Nasir Gadžihanov (16 February 1967 – 29 May 2012) was a Russian naturalized Macedonian wrestler. He competed in the men's freestyle 76 kg at the 2000 Summer Olympics.

References

 

1967 births
2012 deaths
Macedonian male sport wrestlers
Olympic wrestlers of North Macedonia
Wrestlers at the 2000 Summer Olympics
Sportspeople from Makhachkala
Soviet male sport wrestlers
World Wrestling Championships medalists